Aradeo ( or ;) is a town and comune in the province of Lecce, Apulia; in south-eastern Italy.

References

Cities and towns in Apulia
Localities of Salento